Nattapon Woratayanan (born May 23, 1985), is a Thai professional footballer who plays as a midfielder for Chachoengsao Hi-Tek. When 2004, Nattapon have been selected in the project "Chang Thai to Everton" and got a change to go to football practice at Everton.

Honours

Club
PEA
 Thai Premier League: 2008

Buriram
 Thai Division 1 League: 2011

Ratchaburi
 Thai Division 1 League: 2012

External links
 Profile at Goal

1985 births
Living people
Nattapon Woratayanan
Nattapon Woratayanan
Nattapon Woratayanan
Nattapon Woratayanan
Nattapon Woratayanan
Nattapon Woratayanan
Nattapon Woratayanan
Nattapon Woratayanan
Nattapon Woratayanan
Nattapon Woratayanan
Nattapon Woratayanan
Thai expatriate sportspeople in the United Kingdom